Golzar Kalay (also Gulzar Kalay) is a village of  Zabul Province, Afghanistan.

See also
 Zabul Province

References

Populated places in Zabul Province